Anthene lysicles, the violet-spotted ciliate blue, is a butterfly in the family Lycaenidae. It is found in Sierra Leone, Liberia, Ivory Coast, Ghana, Togo, Nigeria (south and the Cross River loop), Cameroon, Gabon, the Republic of the Congo, the Central African Republic and the Democratic Republic of the Congo (Shaba). The habitat consists of forests.

The larvae feed on

References

Butterflies described in 1874
Anthene
Butterflies of Africa
Taxa named by William Chapman Hewitson